Fit for Rivals is an American rock band that originated in Jacksonville, Florida. The band's core members are songwriter/vocalist Renée Phoenix and songwriter/guitarist Thomas Amason. The band released their debut album Steady Damage on July 9, 2009, and the follow-up, Freak Machine was released on September 2, 2016.

With hundreds of millions of streams, a top ten radio hit with "Novocain" and worldwide touring, Fit for Rivals has developed a dedicated fan-base through grassroots marketing and viral videos. Renée and Thomas continue to write music together and are planning on releasing new music through Phoenix’s label, Freak Machine Records in 2022.

History
Fit for Rivals formed in 2009 when Renée Phoenix met Thomas Amason while looking for a new guitarist for her band The Explicits.

Steady Damage (2009)
In 2009, Fit for Rivals released their debut EP Was That Our Youth?. Later in the year, the band began recording their debut studio album, Steady Damage, which was self-released on July 18, 2009. It spawned the singles "Crash" and "Damage" and music videos were recorded for both. The track "Crash" has notably been used as a theme song for WWE's Over the Limit pay-per-view and was featured in multiple films and television programs, including Legendary.

Freak Machine (2015-2016)
The band released their second EP Sugar on July 17, 2015 and consists of 4 tracks: "Special Kind of Crazy", "Light that Shines", "Freak Machine" and "Hit Me". A music video for "Hit Me" was released on August 27, 2014. A fan music video for "Freak Machine" was posted on their YouTube channel on November 11, 2014. 

After the release of Sugar, Fit for Rivals began working on their second studio album entitled Freak Machine. Freak Machine was released on September 2, 2016 via Big 3 Records/Sony Red and was produced by Thomas Amason.

Hiatus and Solo Work (2018-2020)
On March 17, 2018, Phoenix released her debut solo EP Renée Phoenix, announced via Instagram post. In May 2018, Phoenix announced that Fit for Rivals was going on a hiatus through an Instagram post. Renée and Thomas continued to write music together through this period.

Freak Machine Records and New Projects (2020-present)
In 2020, Phoenix founded her own music label called Freak Machine Records, due to being unsatisfied with the treatment given to artists by labels, and therefore feeling the need to take it upon herself to create a friendlier environment. The label now encompasses all of Renée's projects and serves as the gateway to release all of the future material. Through the year 2020, four songs have been released under the label, all being released as Fit For Rivals songs part of the B Sides & Oddities EP, which includes the fan-favorite track "No Way In Hell", a song that wasn't available on streaming services before despite its popularity among the fanbase and a large amount of YouTube views while not even having an official upload by Fit For Rivals until December 4th, 2020.

As for future projects, Phoenix has said she is working on her sophomore EP, which is going to be released under Freak Machine Records. Also, Phoenix, alongside Amason, have been working on the third Fit For Rivals album, which is also going to be released under Freak Machine Records. Further information has not been provided publicly.

Musical Style
Fit for Rivals has been described as rock, punk rock and pop punk. Renée Phoenix's "raspy" and "gritty" vocal style is compared to that of Joan Jett, whom she says she admires, and Brody Dalle. Their EP Sugar has a bit of a throwback sound, as described in New Noise Magazine.

Members
Current Members
Renée Phoenix – Vocals, composer guitar (2009-present)
Thomas Amason – Guitar, composer, keys, backing vocals (2009-present)
Jordyn Zubyk - Drums (2021-present)
Rufino Lomboy - Lead guitar (2015-present)
Dave Dones - Bass Guitar (2021-present)
Shae Padilla - Guitar (2021-present)
Dorman Pantfoeder - Studio Drums (2009-present)
Former Members
Eli Clark - Bass guitar, backing vocals
John Hartman - Drums 
Benjamin Nelson - Drums
Joshua Hamilton - Bass guitar
Ronnie Winter - Bass guitar
Dorman Pantfoeder - Drums

Associated Acts
Renée Phoenix
The Explicits
The Red Jumpsuit Apparatus
Love Arcade

Discography

Albums
The Explicits

 The Explicits (2006)
Fit For Rivals
 Steady Damage (2009)
 Freak Machine (2016)
Renée Phoenix
 Renée Phoenix (2018)

EPs
Fit For Rivals
 Was That Our Youth? (2009)
 Sugar (2015)

Music videos
The Explicits

Fit for Rivals

Renée Phoenix

References

External links
 

Alternative rock groups from Florida
Pop punk groups from Florida
American pop rock music groups
Hard rock musical groups from Florida
Musical groups established in 2008
Musical quintets